The women's sprint competition at the 2021 FIL World Luge Championships was held on 29 January 2021.

Results
The qualification was held at 11:15 and the final at 14:31.

References

Women's sprint